The Leeward Islands Airline Pilots Association is a trade union in the Leeward Islands and is registered in both Antigua and Barbados.

Currently, all of LIALPA's members fly for LIAT, a regional airline based in Antigua and owned by several eastern the Caribbean governments and organisations.

See also

 List of trade unions

External links
 International Federation of Air Line Pilots' Associations
 Caribbean Regional Aviation Network

Trade unions in Antigua and Barbuda
Trade unions in Barbados
Airline pilots' trade unions